Zimbabwe is a landlocked sovereign state located in southern Africa. Mineral exports, gold, agriculture, and tourism are the main foreign currency earners of Zimbabwe.

Notable firms 
This list includes notable companies with primary headquarters located in the country. The industry and sector follow the Industry Classification Benchmark taxonomy. Organizations which have ceased operations are included and noted as defunct.

See also
 Economy of Zimbabwe
 List of airlines of Zimbabwe
 List of banks in Zimbabwe

References

Zimbabwe